Jitendra Kumar Mukhiya (born 22 November 1992) is a Nepalese cricketer. He is from Rajpur Rautahat. Jitendra is a right-handed batsman and a right-arm medium-fast bowler. He made his debut for Nepal against Denmark in November 2013.

He represents the Nepal Army Club of the National League and Panchakanya Tej of the Nepal Premier League and kathmanduXikings in Everest premier league.

Playing career 

Jitendra Mukhiya was the first pick from coach Pubudu Dassanayake in his search for fresh fast bowling talent ahead of experienced seamers in the Nepali squad. He is the epitome of hard work and self-belief. Though sent to Singapore to practice with the squad for the ACC Emerging Teams Cup 2013, he didn't make the final cut and was called back. Through continuous good performances in the domestic circuit it was impossible for him to not be picked for the 2013 ICC World Twenty20 Qualifier, UAE.

Unlike many other players in the national squad, Mukhiya has not been a part of any age group teams for Nepal, but his success was not limited by this. Playing his first tournament for his country, he managed to pick up a total of 11 wickets and established himself as the strike bowler of the team. His wickets, most of them as they were in crucial matches in the 2013 ICC World Twenty20 Qualifier, including 3 each against Hong Kong and Bermuda and 2 each against Denmark and Kenya, showcased the level of bowler he is.

He picked up 4 wickets in the 2014 ICC World Twenty20 and won the man of the match award in the match against Afghanistan by picking of 3 important wickets.

References

External links 
 
 Jitendra Mukhiya on ESPNcricinfo
 Jitendra Mukhiya on CricketArchive
 Jitendra Mukhiya's Facebook Profile

Living people
1992 births
People from Rautahat District
Nepalese cricketers
Nepal Twenty20 International cricketers
Cricketers at the 2014 Asian Games
Asian Games competitors for Nepal